Petrus Norbertus Donders (27 October 1809 – 14 January 1887) was a Dutch Roman Catholic priest and member of the Redemptorist Congregation. He served in various missions in the Dutch colony of Surinam. He started working in the capital Paramaribo, but is predominantly known for his work in and around the leper colony Batavia, where he died in 1887. Peter Donders was beatified as 'Apostle of the Indians and Lepers' in 1982. The miracle needed was found in the cure of a Dutch child from bone cancer back in 1929.

Life
Peter Donders was born in Tilburg in the Netherlands on 27 October 1809 as the eldest of two children to Arnoldus Donders and Petronella van den Brekel. His younger brother was named Martin. When he was seven, his mother died. He desired to become a priest, but his father could not afford proper education. Donders worked in the local textile industry. Later he attended Beekvliet seminary in Sint-Michielsgestel. In 1831 he was deemed unfit for military service. In 1833 he applied to join the Jesuits in Belgium but was denied; he met the same results from the Redemptorists and Franciscans. Than a benefactor enabled him to pursue his theological studies at the College of Haaren, which he entered in 1837.

Reports in the Annals of the Propagation of the Faith, a journal about various Catholic missions, attracted Donders interest to go abroad and work among the 'Indians' in Amerika. In 1839 Surinam apostolic prefect Jacobus Grooff visited the College of Haaren in search of missionaries for the colony (now the independent Republic of Suriname). Donders applied and was accepted. He was ordained to priesthood in 1841.

In September 1843 Donders arrived in Paramaribo, where he was a chaplain for 14 years. He served under four successive vicars (bishops). From Paramaribo he visited some plantations owned by Catholics along the Suriname River and Commewijne River. In 1856 apostolic vicar Jacobus Schepers appointed Donders pastor at the mission post of Batavia along the Coppename River. This remote place, a former cocoa plantation, was a governmental leper colony (since 1824), having a permament Catholic residence (since 1836). In 1853 it counted 453 enslaved Afro-Surinamese lepers.

In 1865 the Holy See assigned the Surinam mission to the Dutch Redemptorists. Now Donders could join the congregation. He was vested in the habit by vicar Johannes Swinkels on 1 November 1866, and made his final vows in Paramaribo on 24 June 1867. Having more assistants in Batavia father Donders was now able to make missionary journeys. He visited plantations along the Saramacca River en visited relatively independent communities in the interior, such as the Native American Arawak, Warao and Kalina and the Afro American Kwinti people (Bushinengue). He baptized a lot but converted little.

In 1882 Donders was called back to Paramaribo by vicar Johannes Schaap who send him to Mary's Hope, a mission post in the Coronie District that was in fact a cotton plantation. In October 1885 Schaap restationed Donders at Batavia, where he died due to a kidney infection (nephritis) on January 14, 1887. Peter Donders was buried in the Batavia cemetery, next to the church.

Worship
The Dutch Redemptorists lacked an appealing saint in its ranks, which was a disadvantage in the recruitment of new missionaries. The congregation initiated a process for Donders' canonization, both in Suriname and in the Netherlands. The first steps were taken by the bishops of the 's-Hertogensboch and Paramaribo dioceses in 1900.

Remains 
In 1900 Donders' remains were interred in St. Peter and Paul's graveyard in Paramaribo. In 1921 they were relocated to a tomb in the left wing of the church. The tomb was renovated in 2010 together with the interior of the cathedral. Batavia was made a pilgrimage site in 2001.

Native soil 
In 1900 the Redemptorists bought the land around Donders' birthplace in the north of Tilburg. In 1923, a memorial stone was placed at the site and a Surinam-like chapel erected, next to which a processional park was laid out. In 1926 a Petrus Donders statue was erected in Wilhelminapark, central Tilburg. In 1930 Donders' house of birth was reconstructed, close to a well containing miraculous water. That year a second Donders monument was unveiled in his native soil, depicting different aspects of his life. To complete the site as a place of pilgrimage a Museum of Charity was opened in the park in 2009. The museum and surrounding park is managed by the Tilburg Petrus Donders Foundation since 2014.

Apostolic process 
On his way to beatification Donders was already allowed to be called Servant of God. In 1913 Pope Pius X declared the late priest to be respectabel. Subsequently, in 1914, 1915 and 1919, apostolic processes were held for his beatification. A proposed miraculous healing in 1929 of the Tilburg born child Ludovicus Johann Westland was rejected twice by the Vatican medical commission of the Congregation for Rites, in 1931 and in 1936. During the Second World War three more meetings were held in Rome discussing Donders' cause. All objections of the devil's advocate were refuted by the general postulator. Then, in March 1945, Pope Pius XII declared him venerable, which means that Donders had practiced his virtues 'to an heroic degree'. This is a condition for beatification. But a miracle was still missing.

In 1976, the Redemptorists once again presented Westland's healing, but now with some new information; the bone infection had been cured overnight, which could not be explained naturally. In 1978 this was approved by the medical experts of the C.C.S. as did the cardinal and bishop members. Exemption was granted for a second miracle that would have otherwise been needed for Donders to be beatified under the old rules that were still in force regarding sainthood causes. This led the pavement for Donders beatification by Pope John Paul II on 23 May 1982. The beatification came to everybody's surprise, but it coincided perfectly with the 250th anniversary of the Redemptorist Congregation, founded in 1732. Meanwhile, serious attempts have been made to have Donders canonized. This requires a miracle that must have taken place after the 1982 beatification. For this purpose the Donders Foundation set up a canonization working group that is in close contact with the two vice-postulators in the Netherlands and in Suriname. The current general postulator for this cause in Rome is the Redemptorist priest Antonio Marrazzo.

Controverse
Since the beatification in 1982 the Petrus Donders statue in central Tilburg is subject to debate, because of its hierarchic composition. The  kneeling leper is a nameless, enslaved African. The monument not only represents the Dutch mission and leper care in Suriname, it also reminds of the oppression and forced christianization of the Afro-Caribbean and indigenous population in the Dutch western colonies. The 19th century priests -including Donders- had no respect for existing religious beliefs, such as Winti. At the time the statue was erected religious zeal and colonial politics were closely related. Therefore, the statue has a strong catholic as well as colonial symbolism. But a work of art in public space may not be hurtful or offensive. In 2016 Gloria Wekker stated that the sculpture is a representation of inequality. Black Lives Matter representatives think of the statue as racist. In an open letter the Dutch political party Ubuntu Connected Front (UCF) requested the municipality of Tilburg to move the sculpture, containing two human beings, out of public space. According to UCF it portrayes a Eurocentric and Afrophobic narrative. A museum would be a better and appropriate place for it. The statue is owned by the municipality. The city council expressed its concerns in 2021 and asked for a proper contextualization. An explanatory sign was placed in front of the statue in 2022, with the following text (translated into English):

You see a bronze statue of two men: one man kneeling, one man standing. The kneeling man is a leper from Suriname. The standing man is priest Peter Donders, better known in Tilburg as Peerke Donders. The statue was placed in 1926. At that time, such a representation was common. Today we consider it an undeniable symbol of colonial rule. Of the historic person, Peter Donders himself, we have a more positive imagination. He cared about the fate of the slaves in the leprosy colony Batavia in Suriname, and worked for them for many years.
Nowadays we look very critically at our colonial and slavery past. A painful and confrontational chapter in our history. In Tilburg we do not avoid the conversation about this, taking into account the deeply felt emotion of everyone to be seen, heard and appreciated. Therefore the statue in front of you is controversial. At the same time, it also invites you to have that conversation. 
Preserving this statue in public space is part of this ongoing debate in the city about our history, our slavery past and also about the inclusive city we want to be, in Tilburg. What do you think?

Gallery

See also

 Catholic Church in Suriname
 Father Damien

References

External links
 
 Saints SQPN
 The Redemptorists of the Baltimore Province

1809 births
1887 deaths
19th-century venerated Christians
19th-century Dutch Roman Catholic priests
Beatified Redemptorists
Beatifications by Pope John Paul II
Deaths from nephritis
Dutch beatified people
Dutch Roman Catholic missionaries
Dutch emigrants to Suriname
People from Tilburg
Roman Catholic missionaries in Suriname
Redemptorists
Venerated Catholics
19th-century Surinamese people
Iconoclasm